North Oxfordshire Academy is a coeducational academy school in Banbury, Oxfordshire, England. It opened in September 2007, replacing the comprehensive Drayton School. It caters for children and young adults between the ages of 11 and 18.

The Academy
North Oxfordshire Academy is a part of United Learning. Pupils officially started learning at the academy on Monday 10 September 2007. Pupils had an opening ceremony on Thursday 13 September 2007 to commemorate them as the foundation (First) pupils to be in the academy. They were presented with a certificate and a badge. At the end of the summer term 2007, two of the school’s four main blocks, A Block and C block, were cleared and sealed off ready for refurbishment work that was due to start in September 2007. Its sixth form opened in September 2008. In a recent Ofsted/HMI report the officials advised that the academy had innovative strategies to improve the teaching and learning and confirmed that the academy was continuing to move in a positive direction.

When the Academy was established a new block was built with a new hall, reception, canteen and pupil support classrooms. School meals are provided by Caterlink . In 2010 the vertical tutoring system started which introduced the five new sections of the school named after leading universities/colleges: University of Cambridge, University of Oxford, University of Warwick, King's College London and Imperial College. This has since changed to horizontal tutoring. Now in addition to the normal uniform students are also required to wear a tie with the corresponding college colours: red, blue, green, purple and yellow.

Since then, the colleges have been renamed after the influential British figures Alan Turing, Winston Churchill, Emmeline Pankhurst, and Stephen Hawking.

It was originally to be called Banbury Academy but due to opposition from Wykham Park Academy (formerly known as Banbury School), the name was changed to North Oxfordshire Academy. The cost of the academy is estimated to be around £20 million.

The school day
The academy day starts at 08:30 and finishes at 15:20 each day. The exception to this is Thursdays, which change the school day to finish at 15:30, and Fridays in which pupils finish at 14:50. The timetable consists of four 1 hour & 20 minute periods each day, and this includes one 20-minute break, one 40-minute lunch break and one tutor lesson after lunch.

Principals
Ruth Robinson (2007–2011)
Sara Billins (2011–2020)
Alison Merrills (2020–present)

See also
Drayton School

External links 
 North Oxfordshire Academy
 United Learning Official Website
 March 2009 Ofsted/HMI Report

Academies in Oxfordshire
Educational institutions established in 2007
Secondary schools in Oxfordshire
United Learning schools
2007 establishments in England